Michael Preetz (born 17 August 1967) is a German former professional footballer who played as a forward. He spent his whole career in Germany, playing for Fortuna Düsseldorf, 1. FC Saarbrücken, MSV Duisburg and SG Wattenscheid 09, but he is mostly remembered for his seven-year spell at Hertha BSC where he ended his career. After retiring from active play, he stayed with the club, going directly into management.

Playing career
Michael Preetz scored 178 goals in the top two divisions of the German league system. In 1998–99 he won the top scorer crown of the Bundesliga.

His good form in this season brought him a call-up to Erich Ribbeck's Germany national team in early 1999. Overall, he won seven caps.

Managerial career
On 7 June 2009, Preetz was named as the new general manager of Hertha BSC, replacing former VfB Stuttgart and FC Bayern Munich forward Dieter Hoeneß. On 23 January 2021, Preetz, along with manager Bruno Labbadia, was relieved of his duties.

Managerial record

Honours
Hertha BSC
Ligapokal: 2001, 2002; runners-up 2000

References

1967 births
Living people
Footballers from Düsseldorf
German footballers
Germany international footballers
Germany youth international footballers
Germany under-21 international footballers
Association football forwards
1999 FIFA Confederations Cup players
Fortuna Düsseldorf players
SG Wattenscheid 09 players
1. FC Saarbrücken players
MSV Duisburg players
Hertha BSC players
Bundesliga players
2. Bundesliga players
Kicker-Torjägerkanone Award winners
Recipients of the Order of Merit of Berlin
West German footballers